The Gewisse were a tribe or clan of Anglo-Saxon England, historically assumed to have been based in the upper Thames region around Dorchester on Thames (but may have actually originated near Old Sarum in Wiltshire). The Gewisse are one of the direct precursors of modern-day England, being the origin of its predecessor states (the Kingdom of Wessex and thereafter the Kingdom of England, prior to the Norman Conquest) according to Saxon legend.

Etymology

The name was first documented as Gewissorum in the eighth century as an ethnonym of the West Saxons. Its origin is uncertain. The Old English adjective ġewisse means "reliable" or "sure", and its corresponding noun means "certainty," though it is unclear how this is related to the tribe. Alternatively, the name may be derived from gweiθ, a Brittonic word for “fortification, earthwork or fort.” Eilert Ekwall proposed that the similarity in toponymy between the kingdoms of the Gewisse and Hwicce suggests a common origin, and an analysis by Richard Coates concluded that Hwicce was of Brittonic origin.

Several linguists believe the word (in the form it has come down to us) is not the result of a normal linguistic development, and that attempts to deduce its evolution are problematic without accounting for same:

The Anglo-Saxon Chronicle presents an eponymous ancestor figure, named Giwis, which is an example of non-historical founding myths.

The Winchester (or Parker) Chronicle has "...Cynric, son of Cerdic, son of Elesa, son of Gewis, son of Wig, son of Freawine, son of Frithugar, son of Brand, son of Beldeg, son of Woden, son of Finn, son of Godwulf, son of Geats..." listed as descent from Cerdic of Wessex. This manuscript does not present Gewis as eponymous, but in the Parker Manuscript's current state, is reconstructed from both apparently missing pages of the work, as well as a later fire, long after the manuscript had been recorded and disseminated. According to the Stanford Library, the Provenance of the manuscript is as follows [16]:

History
Evidence of Germanic settlements appearing around Abingdon and Dorchester on Thames in the 6th and 7th centuries has been used to make assumptions about the origins of the Ġewisse, presuming them to be Germanic mercenaries that may have been settled in the region after the end of the Roman occupation to protect a border region between Britons. In fact, both the name of the tribe and the name of its founding house are Brittonic and circumstantial evidence suggests the tribe originated from Old Sarum. 

The early Saxon myths say that the Gewisse captured Searobyrig (Old Sarum) in AD 552 and Beranbyrig (Barbury Castle) from the Britons in 556. Birinus converted the Gewisse to Christianity in AD 636 by baptising their king Cynegils and establishing the Diocese of Dorchester. The Gewisse killed the three sons of Sæbert of Essex in about 620, defeated the Britons at the Battle of Peonnum in 660 and by 676 had sufficient control over what is now Hampshire to establish a see at Winchester.

The conquests by the royal house of Gewisse in the 7th and 8th centuries led to the establishment of the Kingdom of Wessex, and Bede treated the two names as interchangeable. It was only during the reign of Cædwalla (685/6 – 688) that the title "king of the Saxons" began to replace "king of the Gewisse". Barbara Yorke has suggested that it was Cædwalla's conquest of the Jutish province and the South Saxons that led to the need for a new title to distinguish the expanded realm from its predecessor. However, as there are no surviving documents to indicate how these people described themselves, the most that can be said is that by the time Bede was writing (early 8th century), the phrase "West Saxons" had come into use by scholars.

Notes

References

Bibliography

Further reading

History of Berkshire
History of Oxfordshire
People from Vale of White Horse (district)
People from Oxfordshire
Peoples of Anglo-Saxon England
5th century in England
Anglo-Saxon settlements